Uncharacterized protein C17orf78 is a protein encoded by the C17orf78 gene in humans. The name denotes the location of the parent gene, being at the 78th open reading frame, on the 17th human chromosome. The protein is highly expressed in the small intestine, especially the duodenum. The function of C17orf78 is not well defined.

Gene

Location 
C17orf78 (Chromosome 17 Open Reading Frame 78) is found on the long arm cytogenetic band 17q12.  The genomic sequence spans from base pair position 37,375,985 to 37,392,708 on the forward strand, and constitutes a length of 16,723 base pairs. The neighboring genes include TADA2A, DUSP14, and ACACA.

Exons and Introns 
C17orf78 has 7 exon regions within its encoding area. C17orf78 also has a total of 6 intron regions spanning its sequence.

Transcripts 
C17orf78 has two splice variant isoforms. Isoform 1 is encoded by a mRNA sequence that is 1920 base pairs in length. Isoform 2 derives from a mRNA sequence of 1678 base pairs.

Protein 
The primary sequence of C17orf78 has been predicted to be 30.55kDa, with an isoelectric point of 9.62.

Uncharacterized protein C17orf78 isoform 1 (C17orf78-204) has a span of 275 amino acids, including all 7 exons. C17orf78 isoform 1 is the principle protein.

Uncharacterized protein C17orf78 isoform 2 (C17orf78-203) has a span of 159 amino acids, constituted from 5 exon regions, which include the 1st, 2nd, 3rd, 6th, and 7th exons of the principle protein.

Expression 
C17orf78 has high expression in the human small intestine, particularly the duodenum and has been detected in small expression levels in the testes and other tissues. Fetal expression lowers in all tissues over time with development except for the intestines, which shows increasing expression over time.

Subcellular Location 
Predictive analysis of C17orf78 by Psort2 places the primary location in the nucleus because of a nuclear localization signal. C17orf78 is also potentially a transmembrane protein due to the presence of a transmembrane region.

Structure

Protein 
C17orf78 secondary structure has been predicted to have several alpha helices and strands as well as beta sheets.

Regulation

DNA Promoter 
The Genomatix tool Gene2Promoter found one viable promoter region. The region was found to span from base pairs 37374332 to 37376025.

mRNA 
The mRNA secondary structure for C17orf78 was found by the online tool RNAfold show a moderate affinity for stem-loop (hairpin) structures.

Post Translational Modification 
Phosphorylation is predicted to occur at a number of sites on C17orf78. PKC-phosphorylation and CK2 phosphorylation are predicted to have various sites on C17orf78 with high confidence.

N-linked glycosylation is predicted to occur at three locations on C17orf78. Asparagine linked glycosylation was predicted to occur on C17orf78 orthologs with high confidence.

Myristolyation has been predicted to occur on C17orf78 by the ExPASy tool Motif Scan.

Homology & Evolution 

C17orf78 orthologs have been identified in mammals, birds, and reptiles. It is a rapidly evolving gene, with around 40 base pairs mutating every 100 million years. There are no known paralogs of this gene in humans.

References 

Genes on human chromosome 17